Dr. Zoltán Timkó (11 June 1874 – 11 April 1946) was a Hungarian jurist, who served as Crown Prosecutor of Hungary from 1940 to 1944.

References

 Révai Lexikon

1874 births
1946 deaths
Hungarian jurists
People from Košice